Presidential elections are due to be held in Egypt in 2024.

Electoral system
The President of Egypt is elected using the two-round system. The constitution of Egypt requires that election proceedings shall not begin earlier than 120 days from the date of the end of the current presidential term, which ends on 7 June 2024 and the results shall not announced be later than 30 days before the date of the end of the current presidential term.

References

2024 elections in Africa
2024 in Egypt
2024